State Forest Management Centre (abbreviated RMK) is Estonian state institution which focuses mainly on forest management in Estonia, but also seed and plant management, timber marketing, land management, nature conservation, visitor management and nature education.

RMK’s forestry duties include the growing and guarding of the state forest, planting and growing of new forest, organising forestry works and sale of timber. RMK maintains forest roads and drainage systems.

RMK provides as varied opportunities as possible for recreation, while not harming the biota there. RMK builds hiking trails, maintains accommodation facilities, marks scenic recreational areas, and prepares camping sites and campfire places. Besides the creation of recreational opportunities, RMK also provides education about the natural environment.

RMK’s plant and seed management area grows tree sets and ensures Estonia has a sufficient reserve of forest seed.

RMK consists of Sagadi Forest Centre, Elistvere Animal Park and, as of 2014, also the Põlula Fish Farm. One to two year old juvenile salmon are grown in Põlula, in order to increase the biodiversity of Estonian rivers.

RMK was established in 1999.

References

External links

Forestry in Estonia
Nature conservation in Estonia